Valeria Dmitrievna Savinykh (born 20 February 1991) is a Russian tennis player.

In April 2012, she achieved a career-high singles ranking of world No. 99. On 20 November 2017, she peaked at No. 98 in the WTA doubles rankings. Savinykh has won nine singles and 23 doubles titles on the ITF Circuit, along with one doubles title on WTA Challenger Tour.

Career
Her father, Dmitry, introduced her into tennis at age five, and her mother, Elena, often travels with her.
Valeria trains at the SotoTennis Academy in Spain.

Since November 2012, Savinykh is coached by Tomasz Iwański.

Performance timeline

Singles 
Current after the 2023 Thailand Open.

WTA career finals

Doubles: 2 (2 runner-ups)

WTA Challenger finals

Doubles: 1 (title)

ITF Circuit finals

Singles: 23 (9 titles, 14 runner–ups)

Doubles: 49 (23 titles, 26 runner–ups)

Notes

References

External links
 
  

1991 births
Living people
Russian female tennis players